Coleophora melanograpta is a moth of the family Coleophoridae. It is found in Japan (the islands of Hokkaido and Honshu) and China.

Adults are on wing in July.

The larvae feed on the leaves of Quercus mongolica, Quercus serrata, Quercus dentata and Quercus acutissima. It is covered with light yellowish-brown felt. They feed on the upper surface of the leaves of their host plant, without making mines.

References

melanograpta
Moths described in 1935
Moths of Japan
Moths of Asia